Thomas Sallows (born March 3, 1984) is a Canadian curler from Grande Prairie, Alberta. He regularly plays skip for a Grande Prairie, Alberta-based rink. He also competed at both the 2015 Tim Hortons Brier and 2015 Ford World Men's Curling Championship as an alternate for the Canadian national curling team.

Sallows also owns Mountain Man Adventures, a Canadian hunting and guiding business. He's been a featured expert on multiple hunting programs, including Wild TV. He is also a concrete finisher.

His sister is competitive curler Cary-Anne McTaggart.

References

External links
 

1984 births
Living people
Curlers from Alberta
People from Grande Prairie
Canadian male curlers
World curling champions